Florence (Salish: čp̓úƛ̓us ) is a census-designated place (CDP) in Ravalli County, Montana, United States. The population was 821 at the 2020 census.

History
Florence was named for Florence Abbott Hammond, wife of A. B. Hammond, a lumber baron.

Geography
Florence is located at  (46.637135, -114.081191).

Demographics

As of the census of 2000, there were 901 people, 323 households, and 266 families residing in the CDP. The population density was 190.7 people per square mile (73.7/km2). There were 336 housing units at an average density of 71.1 per square mile (27.5/km2). The racial makeup of the CDP was 96.12% White, 1.44% Native American, 0.11% Asian, 0.44% Pacific Islander, and 1.89% from two or more races. Hispanic or Latino of any race were 1.89% of the population.

There were 323 households, out of which 39.3% had children under the age of 18 living with them, 70.6% were married couples living together, 8.7% had a female householder with no husband present, and 17.6% were non-families. 14.6% of all households were made up of individuals, and 5.3% had someone living alone who was 65 years of age or older. The average household size was 2.79 and the average family size was 3.07.

In the CDP, the population was spread out, with 29.3% under the age of 18, 5.3% from 18 to 24, 28.4% from 25 to 44, 28.5% from 45 to 64, and 8.4% who were 65 years of age or older. The median age was 37 years. For every 100 females, there were 93.8 males. For every 100 females age 18 and over, there were 96.0 males.

The median income for a household in the CDP was $39,286, and the median income for a family was $47,946. Males had a median income of $29,219 versus $20,795 for females. The per capita income for the CDP was $17,626. About 9.2% of families and 17.3% of the population were below the poverty line, including 29.3% of those under age 18 and 19.6% of those age 65 or over.

Education
The Florence-Carlton School District educates students from kindergarten through 12th grade. Florence-Carlton High School's team name is the Falcons.

Notable people
 Dustin Lind, assistant coach for the San Francisco Giants
 Jim Tyack, Major League Baseball player

References

Census-designated places in Ravalli County, Montana
Census-designated places in Montana